Chung Wan is one of the 15 constituencies in the Central and Western District of Hong Kong, was represented in the Central and Western District Council by Hui Chi-fung of the Democratic Party, who became an Independent on 3 December 2020.

The constituency loosely covers the Central District with the estimated population of 13,351. "Chung Wan" is both the Cantonese transliteration of the Chinese name and an alternative English name for Central District.

Boundaries 
The Chung Wan constituency covers most of Central District and Admiralty, as well as the portion of Sheung Wan east of Cleverly Street and Ladder Street. The Sheung Wan, Central, Hong Kong and Admiralty stations of MTR are within the boundaries of the Chung Wan constituency.

District Council constituencies bordering Chung Wan includes Mid Levels East, Peak, Sheung Wan and Tung Wah within the same district, as well as Tai Fat Hau of Wan Chai District.

Councillors represented 
The seat is currently held by Ted Hui Chi-fung of the Democratic Party. He replaced Yuen Bun-keung, a founding member of the party who had been holding the seat since 1986, in the 2011 District Council elections, as Yuen refused to seek another term of office. Yuen died in the following year.

1982–1985

1985–1994

1994 to present

Election results

2010s

2000s

1990s

1980s

Notes

Citations

References
2011 District Council Election Results (Central & Western)
2007 District Council Election Results (Central & Western)
2003 District Council Election Results (Central & Western)
1999 District Council Election Results (Central & Western)
 

Constituencies of Hong Kong
1994 in Hong Kong
1999 in Hong Kong
2003 in Hong Kong
2007 in Hong Kong
2011 in Hong Kong
Constituencies of Central and Western District Council
1982 establishments in Hong Kong
Constituencies established in 1982
Central, Hong Kong
Admiralty, Hong Kong
Sheung Wan